WLTR (91.3 MHz) is a noncommercial public FM radio station in Columbia, South Carolina, United States. The station features a news and information radio format with programs from National Public Radio, as well as classical and other genres of music in late mornings, nights and weekends.  WLTR is the flagship station of the statewide "News and Music Network" from South Carolina Public Radio.

WLTR has an effective radiated power (ERP) of 100,000 watts, the maximum permitted for non-grandfathered FM stations.  The transmitter is on Hardscrabble Road near Sloan Road in Columbia.

History
On July 1, 1976, WLTR first signed on the air.  Over time, more stations were added to the network of non-commercial FM outlets around the state, run jointly with South Carolina Educational Television (SCETV).  All the FM stations largely simulcast the programming originating on flagship WLTR, a mix of NPR news and information on weekday mornings and afternoons, with mostly classical music heard middays, nights and weekends.  By the end of the 1990s, many non-commercial NPR stations around the country were eliminating music from their schedules and focusing on all news, talk and information formats.

In 2001, the statewide network of South Carolina Educational Radio Network stations was split, with stations WRJA-FM in Sumter, WJWJ-FM in Beaufort and WHMC-FM in Conway carrying all NPR and local news and information programming.  WLTR continued with its format, featuring news and information in mornings and afternoons, with some classical music and other musical programs, middays, nights and weekends. 89.3 WSCI Charleston and 90.1 WEPR Greenville continue to simulcast WLTR.

References

External links
South Carolina Public Radio Network

LTR
South Carolina Educational Television
Classical music radio stations in the United States
NPR member stations
Radio stations established in 1976
1976 establishments in South Carolina